Lost Creek is a stream in Washington County in the U.S. state of Missouri. It is a tributary of Cedar Creek.

Lost Creek was named for the fact it is a losing stream or subterranean stream along parts of its course.

See also
List of rivers of Missouri

References

Rivers of Washington County, Missouri
Rivers of Missouri